Huntingdon was a rural district in Huntingdonshire from 1894 to 1974, lying to the north and west of urban Huntingdon. It was formed in 1894 under the Local Government Act 1894 from the earlier Huntingdon rural sanitary district.

It was expanded in 1935 by taking in most of the disbanded Thrapston Rural District and part of the Huntingdonshire segment of Oundle Rural District.

In 1965 Huntingdonshire and the Soke of Peterborough merged to form Huntingdon and Peterborough.

In 1974 the district was abolished under the Local Government Act 1972 and became part of the non-metropolitan district of Huntingdon, subsequently renamed Huntingdonshire.

Parishes

References 

Districts of England abolished by the Local Government Act 1972
Districts of England created by the Local Government Act 1894
Rural districts of England